Sinosuthora is a genus of passerine birds in the family Paradoxornithidae.

The genus was erected by the ornithologists John Penhallurick and Craig Robson in 2009. The type species is the spectacled parrotbill.
 
It contains the following species:
 Spectacled parrotbill (Sinosuthora conspicillata)
 Vinous-throated parrotbill (Sinosuthora webbiana)
 Ashy-throated parrotbill (Sinosuthora alphonsiana)
 Brown-winged parrotbill (Sinosuthora brunnea)
Yunnan parrotbill (Sinosuthora ricketti)
 Grey-hooded parrotbill (Sinosuthora zappeyi)
 Przevalski's parrotbill (Sinosuthora przewalskii)

References

 
Bird genera
Parrotbills